The town of Senden is the second-largest town of the district of Neu-Ulm in Bavaria and is located at the border to Baden-Württemberg. The town belongs to the Donau-Iller-Nahverkehrsverbund. Senden's neighbours are Neu-Ulm in the north, Weißenhorn in the east, Vöhringen in the south and Illerkirchberg in the west.

Town parts
The town parts are Aufheim, Ay, Freudenegg, Hittistetten, Witzighausen and Wullenstetten

Politics

The Senden town council consists since the election of 2014 of:
CSU: 11 seats
SPD: 5 seats
FWG: 6 seats
Greens: 4 seats
BISS: 4 seats

Economics and infrastructure

Traffic
Senden lies at the Bundesstraße 28 and at the train line Ulm-Oberstdorf (Illertalbahn).

Companies
 Möbel Inhofer

Education

Schools

Elementary- and Main schools
 Elementary school Senden (Bürgermeister-Engelhart-Schule)
 Elementary school Aufheim
 Elementary school Ay
 Elementary school Wullenstetten
 Main school Senden (Rektor-Werner-Ziegler-Schule)

Vocational- and technical highschools
 Urban economics school Senden

Special schools
 Lindenhof-school Senden, private promotion center for mental development

Spare time- and sports centres
 Ice skating rink
 public lake- and indoor swimming pool
 several bathing lakes
 City park with Minigolf

International relations

Senden is twinned with:
Piove di Sacco (Italy).
Uffholtz (France, Alsace)
Senden in North Rhine Westphalia.

Culture
Urban cultural events take mainly place in the 2002 opened "Bürgerhaus".

Music associations
 "Dorfmusikanten Aufheim" (village musicians of Aufheim) with their youth band "WITA"
 "Musikvereinigung Senden-Ay-Oberkirchberg" (united musicians of Senden-Ay-Oberkirchberg) www.musikvereinigung.net
 "Harmonia Wullenstetten" (harmony of Wullenstetten)

Singing associations
 Choir unity "Concordia" Ay
 Choir unity "Frohsinn" Aufheim
 Choir unity "Sängertreu" Senden
 Choir unity Witzighausen-Hittistetten
 Church choir Senden (protestantic)
 Church choir Senden (catholic)

References

External links
  
 www.aufheim.com 
 www.wullenstetten.de 

Neu-Ulm (district)